The Belgian Hare is a "fancy" (i.e., non-utilitarian) breed of domestic rabbit that has been selectively bred to resemble the wild European hare. It is a rabbit rather than a true hare. Averaging , the Belgian Hare is known for its slender and wiry frame and its long and powerful legs.

History

The precursors of the Belgian Hare were created in Belgium in the early 18th century, through the crossbreeding of early domestic rabbits with the wild European rabbit. The intent was to create a practical meat rabbit for small livestock. These rabbits were first imported to England in 1874, where they were dubbed the "Belgian Hare". Breeders there made the Belgian Hare more spirited and lithe, like the wild rabbits of England. By 1877 the first Belgian Hares were being shown in America, where the breed immediately rose in popularity. By 1898, the 'Belgian Hare boom' was peaking. One shipping firm in England at the time stated in its annual report: "Over 6,000 Belgian Hares conveyed safely to the United States during 1900." Numerous Belgian Hare clubs were formed across America and countless rabbits were bred. Because the novice breeders were unable to turn the lanky rabbit into a production meat breed, by 1902 the flooded market had gone bust.

The first of these American Belgian Hare clubs was known as the "American Belgian Hare Association", but with a wide and scattered membership, it lasted not much more than a year. The "Boston Belgian Hare Club" was formed in 1880, and in 1897 the "National Belgian Hare Club of America" came into being. Twelve years later, as additional breeds were being introduced and developed in the US, a new "all-breed" club was formed, called the "National Pet Stock Association". After several name changes, this became today's American Rabbit Breeders Association (ARBA). With the passing of the National Belgian Hare Club many years prior, a dedicated group of breeders applied for a specialty club charter from ARBA, which was granted in July, 1972. The American Belgian Hare Club was born and continues to this day.

Today, the Belgian Hare remains a "fancy" rabbit, with devoted followers in the UK as well as the US, where The Livestock Conservancy currently lists the breed's conservation status as "threatened".

Appearance
The Belgian Hare is most known for its distinctively close resemblance to a hare, with a long, fine body with muscular flank, and distinctly arched back with loins and well-rounded hind quarters. Their head is long and their tail straight and carried in line with the backbone. The fore feet of a Belgian Hare are usually long and fine-boned and perfectly straight, while their hind feet are long, fine, and flat. They are believed to be the only breed of domestic rabbit featuring a deep red, rich chestnut color of the Belgian Hare, together with black ticking of a wavy or blotchy appearance and an extended down the sides.

In the USA, Rufus Red coloration is the only variety recognized. The BRC now recognizes both Black and Tan (called the Tan Hare), and Black Hares in addition to the Rufus Red.

Lifestyle
Due to their difference from other breeds of domestic rabbit, the Belgian Hare may require different dietary and housing requirements to other rabbits, and as a result, they may demand more attention and care.

Due to their size and energetic nature, it is recommended that the Belgian Hare be provided with an enclosure to enable them to move freely. For an outdoor rabbit the ideal home is a shed or indoors with a waterproof roof. If the rabbit is going to live indoors then an enclosure is best. Belgian Hares should have a cage with at least a 3 by 2 metres floor and a height of 1 metres. A breeding or brood enclosure should be 3 metres  by 3 metres, at least (can be bigger)

All rabbits must have an adequate exercise area, whether it is an outside run or an enclosed area in the house. Softwood shavings should not be used for the floor of the enclosure as they can cause respiratory problems. Fine sawdust can cause eye irritations so this should be avoided. Bedding material should be provided especially in cold and wet weather for the outdoor rabbit. A recommended practise is to place the straw on top of a layer of the hardwood shavings in the sleeping compartment, in order to ensure warmth and insulation for an outdoor Belgian Hare. The rabbit home should be cleaned out weekly and any old food removed. If it is necessary to wash the home then only use a cleaner specifically designed for cleaning rabbit hutches.

The Belgian Hare has a short coat and if kept clean, requires little grooming other than an occasional rub over to remove any dead coat. When in moult the coat benefits from a good combing through every other day to remove the old coat. This will help bring the new coat through faster and minimize the old fluffy undercoat matting up when its on the way out.

Behaviour
The Belgian Hare is one of the most intelligent and energetic breeds of rabbit, with the potential to train rabbits to become responsive to the sound of their name. Due to their active nature and alert temperament, they can very easily be startled by sudden noise or movement. As a result of their active personality, they have been called "the poor man's racehorse". The Belgian Hare is known to be responsive to handling, particularly when trained from an early age, however, it is recommended that the Belgian Hare should not be handled by children mainly due to their large size and speed that may cause injury.

Diet

As the Belgian Hare has a very high metabolic rate, it may require more food and more consistent feeding than other breeds of domestic rabbit. The specific dietary requirements of a Belgian Hare do not differ significantly from other breeds of domestic rabbit, and like the majority of rabbits, the most important component of the diet of a Belgian Hare is hay, a roughage that reduces the chance of blockages and malocclusion whilst providing indigestible fiber necessary to keep the gut moving. Grass hays such as timothy are generally preferred over legume hays like clover. Legume hays are higher in protein, calories, and calcium, which in excess can cause kidney stones and loose stool. This type of hay should be reserved for young kits or lactating does.

It is recommended that the Belgian Hare, like other rabbits, receive a standard intake of 2 cups of chopped dark, green, leafy vegetables per  of body weight (although this should only be given after four months of age to prevent enteritis), and up to 2 tablespoons of fruit or carrots per 6 pounds of body weight daily. It is common for some owners to provide treats, although in very limited quantities, which can include a few pellets, a slice of strawberry, or other suitable foods. Commercial treats are available in the pet stores can be fed, but owners should stay away from anything with a yoghurt coating, or other ingredients that the rabbit would not encounter in the wild.

Some of the vegetables that rabbits enjoy are romaine lettuce, escarole, turnips, collards, kale, parsley, thyme, cilantro, dandelion, and basil. The green, leafy tops of radish and carrots also are excellent sources of nutrients, but should be fed sparingly due to the high calcium content. New vegetables should be introduced slowly due to the delicate digestive systems of rabbits. It is recommended that cauliflower, broccoli and cabbage be avoided, as they cause gas and can lead to gastrointestinal stasis, which can be fatal. Vegetables such as potatoes and corn should also avoided due to their high starch content. Belgian Hares also require an unlimited amount of fresh water, usually provided for in a water crock, tip-proof ceramic pet dish, or hanging water bottle.

See also

Domestic rabbit
List of rabbit breeds

References

External links
PetPlanet - Small Breed profile
Belgian Hare Breed Description - Furry Critter Network
Horn Rabbits Rabbitry - Belgian Hare Care
Central Pets - Belgian Hare
Belgian Hare Rabbit Breed History
Different Breeds of Rabbits

Rabbit breeds
Rabbit breeds originating in Belgium
Conservation Priority Breeds of the Livestock Conservancy